Mystery Magical Special (also known on screen as Marc Summers' Mystery Magical Tour) is an American television special aired on Nickelodeon. Advertised as a Halloween-themed program, the special was originally produced in 1988, but continued to air, often multiple times, every October for several years afterward, ceasing after 1996.

Primarily, the special was designed to show off the talents of stage magicians Lance Burton and David Avadon, as well as capitalize on Marc Summers' then-newfound popularity as the host of the game show Double Dare. Actors Shiri Appleby, Jonathan Brandis and Trenton Teigen also appear, with John Astin makes a cameo appearance. Filming took place at The Magic Castle in Los Angeles, CA.

References

External links

1980s American television specials
Nickelodeon original programming
Halloween television specials
American television magic shows
1988 television specials